Events in the year 1871 in Portugal.

Incumbents
Monarch: Louis I
Prime Minister: António José de Ávila, 1st Duke of Ávila and Bolama (until 13 September); Fontes Pereira de Melo

Events
9 July – Portuguese legislative election, 1871.

Arts and entertainment

Sports

Births

Regina Pacini, lyric soprano (died 1965)
José Ramos Preto, politician (died 1949)

Deaths

References

 
Portugal